is a fictional character and the chief protagonist of Nintendo's Star Fox series. He is an anthropomorphic fox created and designed by Shigeru Miyamoto and Takaya Imamura. He was introduced as a player character in the original 1993 video game Star Fox. In each game, to varying extents, the player controls Fox in his Arwing. He is the leader of the Star Fox team, and is joined by his wingmates on various missions.

Fox is the protagonist of several Star Fox games, comics, and other media. He has featured in several other game franchises, including as a playable character in every installment of the Super Smash Bros. series. Fox has received mostly positive reviews from critics.

Concept and design

In 1992, Nintendo and Argonaut Software collaborated to produce a 3D space shooter for the Super NES, provisionally titled 'SnesGlider'. The development team, led by Shigeru Miyamoto, redesigned what had been a tech demo into a rail shooter, with Nintendo designing the game and Argonaut handling the programming aspects. However, without a story, it lacked any incentive to play beyond flying and shooting. Miyamoto sketched out a universe, but could not decide on a natural hero to convey a sense of an epic space saga. Names under consideration included "Star Wolf", "Star Sheep", "Star Fox", "Star Sparrow", and "Star Hawk". Miyamoto finally settled on having a fox as the main character after visiting Fushimi Inari-taisha in Kyoto, the head shrine of Inari, a Japanese kami associated with foxes. Inari is portrayed as being able to fly, and its shrines, particularly the one in Kyoto, are surrounded by red arches (torii), giving Miyamoto the idea of a fox that could fly through arches. Fox's face was modeled after Inari's, and usually wears a "red turtleneck" or "red scarf" around his neck, like the statue. Fox McCloud's personality is heavily based on Shigeru Miyamoto's own personality, with the surname 'McCloud' being suggested by Dylan Cuthbert, one of Argonaut's programmers.

Fox McCloud is an anthropomorphic fox with orange-brown fur, with golden-brown or white highlights. He has a stereotypical bushy white-tipped tail which appears to be very short in Star Fox 64 and Command. His eyes are inconsistently shown to be either green or blue. He will occasionally wear large tanker boots over his legs when fighting on the ground. Fox's outfit has changed in every game he appears in, but generally includes an orange or green jumpsuit under a pale gray flight jacket or combat vest and a headset. In Star Fox 64, if the game is played in expert mode, Fox wears a pair of sunglasses similar to what his father wore. Nintendo has never officially cited Fox's age or height in a game manual, but Nintendo Power released a card featuring Fox, which stated that during Star Fox 64 he is 18 years old, his height is 1.73 SM and his weight is 70.31 SK. Fox would be 26 in Adventures (as Adventures takes place just 8 years after the events of Star Fox 64), 27 in Assault (the game manual stated 1 year had passed since the conclusion of Adventures), and 29 to 30 in Command (exactly three years right after the conclusion of Assault).

Unlike the consistency with other Nintendo characters, such as Mario, several different individuals have voiced Fox. He was first voiced by Daniel Owsen in Star Fox, in both the English and Japanese versions of the game. His most consistent English voice actor has been Mike West, who first portrayed the character in the localized release of Star Fox 64. After a hiatus of fourteen years, West reprised the role for Star Fox 64 3D. He has since then consistently voiced Fox, supplying the character with his voice for Super Smash Bros. for Nintendo 3DS and Wii U, Star Fox Zero, Starlink: Battle for Atlas, and Super Smash Bros. Ultimate. In both the Japanese release of Star Fox 64 and Super Smash Bros., Fox was voiced by Shinobu Satouchi (speaking in English with a Japanese accent for the English version). For English dialogue of Super Smash Bros. Melee and Star Fox Adventures, Fox's voice was done by Rare's Steve Malpass. In Star Fox: Assault, his voice was done by Jim Walker in the English release, and by Kenji Nojima in the Japanese release. Nojima reprised his role for Super Smash Bros. Brawl, as did Walker for the English version. Nojima reprised his role once again in the Japanese version of Super Smash Bros. for Nintendo 3DS and Wii U. In Star Fox 64 3D, Star Fox Zero, Starlink: Battle for Atlas, and Super Smash Bros. Ultimate, he is voiced by Takashi Ōhara in Japanese.

There is a fan theory stating that Fox McCloud, along with other Star Fox members, had his legs amputated and replaced with metal prostheses; Cuthbert stated that the characters' legs were not amputated, and Miyamoto stated that the appearance of metal legs was a design choice rather than an indication that the legs were amputated; he wanted the character to appear more human, and was unaware of the issues faced by fighter pilots at the time.

Appearances

In Star Fox series
The Star Fox franchise has generally treated both the games and certain tie-in media as canonical. However, the franchise has been rebooted twice: Star Fox 64 was a reboot of the original Star Fox (1993), and Star Fox Zero (2016) is a reboot of Star Fox 64. The first reboot in particular changed Fox's personality and backstory substantially, including the name of his father. In the main game continuity roughly from Star Fox 64 to Star Fox Command, Fox is less motivated by any desire to resist tyranny, and more by revenge against Andross and money. In Star Fox Adventures he frequently rolled his eyes or sighed when he found out that he was being asked to do even more work, or when a conversation with a character simply went on too long. Ultimately, he had proven that he is in fact "pure of heart". Fox becomes infatuated with Krystal when he first saw her trapped on top of Krazoa Palace in Star Fox Adventures. He is romantically involved with Krystal after the events of Star Fox Adventures, confirming that they love each other when speaking with Lucy about his relationship with Krystal. During Command Krystal soon leaves after Fox asked her to leave because he feared for her safety. Star Fox Command has several different endings in which they either get back together or split apart completely.

In Star Fox 64 (1997), Fox McCloud's friendship with Bill Grey is depicted during the game, and he fights Wolf O'Donnell of the rival Star Wolf team. The Black Hole of the SNES game is absent, instead, James McCloud is presumed to have died at the hands of Andross himself. Once Star Fox reaches Venom, they fight through its defensive lines or Star Wolf to Andross's base, depending on which route the player takes. Despite the protests of his team, Fox faces Andross alone. If the player has chosen the hard route, Fox's father James appears to lead his son to safety when Andross's base explodes, disappearing when Fox escapes. Whether this was living James, a ghost or a figment of Fox's imagination is yet to be seen. Fox then leaves victorious as Andross's base explodes behind him. Back on Corneria, General Pepper offers to integrate them into the Cornerian army. Fox declines, saying that they prefer doing things their own way. An action figure of Fox McCloud armed with a missile launcher was produced to accompany the game, but never got beyond the prototype stage.

In Star Fox Adventures (2002), a Nintendo GameCube game set eight years after Star Fox 64, Fox McCloud is hired to stop Dinosaur Planet from breaking apart. Fox rescues Prince Tricky, a young dinosaur of the EarthWalker tribe, from the Sharpclaw tribe. The villain of the game, General Scales, plans to conquer the planet piece by piece. The two find four Spell Stones, magical objects that hold the planet together, returning them to their rightful positions, and free Krystal, an imprisoned vixen, in which Fox and Krystal fall in love with a result in Krystal joining the team at the end of the game. Fox then defeats a resurrected Andross, who was the real villain behind the troubles on Dinosaur Planet. McCloud then returns to the Great Fox, and General Pepper pays him for saving the planet. Falco Lombardi, who had been absent for the majority of the game, is reunited with the team. Star Fox Adventures was originally intended for release on the Nintendo 64 as Dinosaur Planet, an action adventure starring Krystal and a fox character named Sabre. Created by developers Rare, the game was essentially complete, and was ready for release in the fourth quarter of 2000. The game was shown off at the E3 video game trade show in May that year, but cancelled shortly afterwards. Nintendo had noticed the similarity between Fox McCloud and Sabre, and decided to convert the game into Star Fox Adventures. In an interview with IGN at the 2000 E3, Shigeru Miyamoto commented on the similarity between the two characters, jokingly suggesting he should call the development team about it.

In Star Fox: Assault (2005), another GameCube game set after Star Fox Adventures, Fox and his team are hired to defeat Andrew Oikonny, Andross's nephew and ex-Star Wolf member, who has started a rebellion against Corneria with the remnants of Andross's forces. The team confronts Oikonny on the planet Fortuna, where the flagship is shot down by a creature known as an Aparoid, a strange, bug-like organism with the ability to assimilate both living beings and machines. On planet Katina, Fox confronts Pigma Dengar, who sent out an S.O.S. signal to lure them in and steals the core memory of a defeated Aparoid, which the team needs in order to locate the Aparoid homeworld and destroy the Aparoid Queen; the Aparoid leader. Star Fox then encounters and gets into a brief skirmish with the Star Wolf team while searching for Pigma, and after further tracking him to the planet Fichina and the Meteo asteroid belt, Fox defeats an Aparoid infected Pigma and obtains the stolen core memory. Fox then saves Dinosaur Planet, now called Sauria, from the Aparoids, but learns that while he was doing so the Aparoids had attacked Corneria. Fox and his team launch a counterattack, and with the surprise help of Star Wolf are able to repel the Aparoids from Corneria. Despite the Aparoids attempt to destroy the warp gate orbiting Corneria, Star Fox use it to reach the Aparoid homeworld, where, once again with unexpected help from Star Wolf, the Queen is destroyed along with the planet itself.

Once again, the Lylat System falls under peril in Star Fox Command (2006), this time under attack by a new foe known as the Anglars, who originated from Venom's acidic oceans. It is up to Fox McCloud to save the galaxy once more by slowly liberating invaded territory and arriving at Venom to defeat the Anglar Emperor. This time, he begins the battle with only ROB 64 at his side, as the rest of the team has been disbanded for various reasons (i.e. dismissing Krystal by fearing for her safety). Along the way, other characters will join Fox and the team becomes whole again. As Command has nine different outcomes, it is uncertain which is the true path Fox and crew take, and even whether or not Command is even canon to the series. Despite this, the developers have suggested that any sequel might ignore the endings and instead pick up the story from the middle. Fox's vehicle is called the Arwing II, which boasts a decent amount of health and boost, and can either receive plasma blasters or twin lasers, depending on the storyline. In this game, Takaya Imamura gave Fox a cartoonish appearance, compared to the more realistic look of Star Fox Adventures and Star Fox: Assault. According to Imamura, realistic fur was unpopular with players.

In other media
Outside of Star Fox series. Fox McCloud has appeared in all five Super Smash Bros. games as a default playable character. In Super Smash Bros. Brawl, he is light, has the third-fastest dashing speed in the game, surpassed only by Captain Falcon and Sonic the Hedgehog, and has fairly weak attacks that allow for a number of combos. His attacks include a blaster, a dash attack, a hexagonal reflector (informally called the "shine"), the "Fire Fox" attack, and the Landmaster Tank as a "Final Smash". Falco Lombardi and Wolf O'Donnell, also from the Star Fox series, have similar movesets. In competitive Super Smash Bros. Melee, Fox is considered to be the character with the most potential and is utilized by numerous top players, such as Adam "Armada" Lindgren and Joseph "Mango" Marquez, although his fast movements make him very difficult to control without practice. Fox also re-appears alongside the rest of the Super Smash Bros. cast in Super Smash Bros. for Nintendo 3DS and Wii U and Super Smash Bros. Ultimate, and is based on his Star Fox Zero design. Fox also has a new Final Smash that makes use of the Arwing vehicle. He also makes a playable appearance in the Nintendo Switch version of Starlink: Battle for Atlas.

Fox also appears as a cameo in other games, notably Stunt Race FX, where a portrait of him can be found in track-side billboards. Additionally, in one of the tracks, an Arwing will occasionally fly overhead. In F-Zero X and GX, a character named James McCloud is a playable racer, bearing the name of Fox's father.

In the 1993 Nintendo Power Star Fox comic based on the SNES game, Fox McCloud is also known as Fox Jr. or Junior and was revealed to be the son of the best pilot on the planet Corneria: Fox McCloud Sr. (later renamed James McCloud). Fox was also becoming an excellent pilot. He met Falco Lombardi, a rowdy but street-savvy bird who wanted to become a pilot. Fox helped Falco clean up his act, and Falco went on to become both a pilot and one of Fox's closest friends. Fox Senior volunteered to test a new gravity bomb Andross had made, and was lost and presumed dead when the bomb detonated with a far greater effect than anyone expected. Andross was exiled from the star system, but returned and built a power base on the planet Venom. Fox protested this turn of events, but the leaders on Corneria, terrified by Andross' power, exiled Fox to the planet Papetoon, which was later taken by Andross. On Papetoon, Fox was shown early on to be a skillful and hotheaded combatant, and to have a strong desire to resist tyranny. He cared little for money, preferring to liquidate anything taken during a raid to support the oppressed peoples he fought for. Eventually, Corneria contacted Fox to pilot their newest space fighter, the Arwing, which could only be effectively used by the best pilots in the system.  After rescuing Fara Phoenix from Venomian military forces, Fox develops a romantic relationship with her, and they hold mutual affections for each other throughout the comics.

Reception
Since the release of the original Star Fox, Fox McCloud has gained a cult following. Nintendo Power listed Fox as their 18th favorite hero, stating that while some of his games weren't the best, he has a long list of accomplishments. Early in the Nintendo 64's lifespan, Fox McCloud ranked fifth in IGN's top five best Nintendo 64 character list. He was included in GameSpot's "All Time Greatest Video Game Hero" contest and reached the "Round 2" before losing to Link. GameDaily named Fox McCloud as the seventh top Nintendo character of all time. IGN praised Fox's appearance in Super Smash Bros. Melee, saying that he featured some of the best texture work and modeling in the game. In their preview of Star Fox: Assault, IGN editors Juan Castro and Matt Casamassina described Fox's voice as juvenile yet tough. Fox ranked eighth on GameDaily's Top 10 Smash Bros. characters list. In an IGN poll for voting from a list of ten Nintendo characters for favorite Nintendo character of all time, Fox came in fourth, behind Link, Mario, and Samus respectively. Entertainment Weekly elected Fox the twelfth coolest videogame character, adding he is a combination of "the heroism of Luke Skywalker, the bravado of Top Gun's Maverick, and the foxiness of, well, a red fox". In 2012, GamesRadar ranked him as the 30th best hero in video games. Gus Turner of Complex Networks listed Fox as the best-forgotten video game heroes. In 2021, Chris Morgan for Yardbarker described Fox as one of "the most memorable characters from old school Nintendo games".

In 2018, Fox was noted as the character that was used by the player "ZD", who won the first tournament of Super Smash Bros. Ultimate. Jeremy Parish of Polygon ranked 73 fighters from Super Smash Bros. Ultimate "from garbage to glorious", criticizing and listing Fox as 41st, stating that "Fox (no items/Final Destination) has become an enduring symbol of how far Smash enthusiasts have to bend over backward to bring the series to something resembling acceptable balance by the standards of the fighting game community. That's not really the character's fault. But, it doesn't change the fact that if you pick Fox as your main, you're a cop", while Gavin Jasper of Den of Geek ranked Fox as 60th of Super Smash Bros. Ultimate characters, criticizing and stated that "it's the guy synonymous with esports Smash, which is the boring kind of Smash, so he's getting this spot on the list".

Notes

References

Animal characters in video games
Anthropomorphic video game characters
Anthropomorphic foxes
Extraterrestrial characters in video games
Fictional foxes
Fictional mercenaries in video games
Fictional military personnel in video games
Fictional space pilots
Male characters in video games
Nintendo protagonists
Orphan characters in video games
Star Fox characters
Super Smash Bros. fighters
Video game characters introduced in 1993
Video game characters who can move at superhuman speeds
Video game mascots
Fictional gunfighters in video games
Fictional aviators